Ilha de Vera Cruz (Portuguese for Island of the True Cross) was the first name given by the Portuguese navigators to the on the northeast coast of what later became Brazil. The name was later changed to Terra de Santa Cruz (Land of the Holy Cross).

When the Portuguese fleet, under Pedro Álvares Cabral, first officially touched land in South America on April 22, 1500, they thought they had found an island, as reflected in the chosen name. They took possession for the Kingdom of Portugal of what was believed to be an island of strategic importance on a western connection between Portugal and the Moluccas and other islands of the East Indies. This discovery marked the beginning of Portuguese colonization in South America. The name was changed to Terra de Santa Cruz when it was realized that it was not an island, but in fact part of a continent.

In 1534, the colonies of Terra de Santa Cruz became the Captaincies of Brazil, land grants to Portuguese captains General by King John III of Portugal.

Colonial Brazil
Exploration of South America
Portuguese colonization of the Americas